Mirror of Life is a 1938 Austrian drama film directed by Géza von Bolváry and starring Peter Petersen, Paula Wessely, and Attila Hörbiger. The film's sets were overseen by art director Julius von Borsody.

Cast

References

External links

Austrian drama films
1938 drama films
Films directed by Géza von Bolváry
Films scored by Hans Lang
Austrian black-and-white films